Toivola is a Finnish language proper name that occurs both as a surname and a place name. It may refer to:

People
 Aleksanteri Toivola (1893–1987), Finnish wrestler
 Hilkka Toivola (1909–2002), Finnish artist
 Jani Toivola (born 1977), Finnish politician
 Jukka Toivola (1949–2011), Finnish long-distance runner
 Miikka Toivola (1949–2017), Finnish footballer

Places
Toivola, Michigan, an unincorporated community in Michigan
Toivola, Minnesota, an unincorporated community in Minnesota
Toivola Township, St. Louis County, Minnesota, a township in Minnesota